The 1995 State of the Union Address was given by the 42nd president of the United States, Bill Clinton, on January 24, 1995, at 9:00 p.m. EST, in the chamber of the United States House of Representatives to the 104th United States Congress. It was Clinton's second State of the Union Address and his third speech to a joint session of the United States Congress. Presiding over this joint session was the House speaker, Newt Gingrich, accompanied by Al Gore, the vice president, in his capacity as the president of the Senate.

It was the first address to a Republican-controlled Congress since 1954. This was also the first time a Republican Speaker sat in the chair since 1954.  

The president discussed his proposals of a New Covenant vision for a smaller government and proposing tax reductions.  The president also discussed crime, the Brady Bill and the Assault Weapons Ban, illegal immigration, and the minimum wage. Regarding foreign policy, he urged assistance in Mexico's economic crisis, additional disarmament in cooperation with Russia and other international treaties, stopping North Korea's nuclear weapons program, legislation to fight terrorists, and peace between Israel and its neighbors. Discussion of the failed attempt to overhaul health care was refocused on more limited efforts to protect coverage for those who have health insurance and expand coverage for children.

The speech lasted nearly 1 hour and 25 minutes and consisted of 9,190 words. In terms of word count it is the longest State of the Union speech in history.

The president acknowledged many Americans of past and present in his speech. Among them were:
 Newt Gingrich, the new Speaker of the House
 Ronald Reagan, who similarly had been president while Congress was controlled by the opposing party; also in the past year he announced his Alzheimer's disease diagnosis
 Jacklyn H. Lucas, who was awarded the Medal of Honor for his actions during the World War II

The Republican Party response was delivered by Governor Christine Todd Whitman of New Jersey. This was the first response given exclusively by a state governor and, delivered in Trenton, the first outside Washington, DC.

Conservative William Kristol called the address the "most conservative State of the Union by a Democratic president in history."

Federico Peña, the Secretary of Transportation, served as the designated survivor.

Immigration
In his 1995 State of the Union address, President Bill Clinton said: “All Americans … are rightly disturbed by the large numbers of illegal aliens entering our country. The jobs they hold might otherwise be held by citizens or legal immigrants. The public service they use impose burdens on our taxpayers.”

See also
Republican Revolution

References

External links

(full transcript), The American Presidency Project, UC Santa Barbara.
1995 State of the Union Response (transcript)
1995 State of the Union Response (video) at C-SPAN
1995 State of the Union Address (video) at C-SPAN
State of the Union: 1993–2000, Washington Post
Full video and audio, Miller Center of Public Affairs, University of Virginia.

State of the Union Address 1995
State of the Union Address
State of the Union Address
State of the Union Address
State of the Union Address
Articles containing video clips
State of the Union Address
Presidency of Bill Clinton
State of the Union Address 1995
1995